Hach is a surname. Notable people with the surname include:

Heather Hach, American screenwriter, librettist and novelist
Hans Hach Verdugo (born 1989), Mexican tennis player
Irv Hach (1873–1936), American baseball player
Kathryn Hach-Darrow (born 1922), American businesswoman
Phila Hach (1926–2015), American chef